Atwood Lake is a small lake southeast of Wilmurt in Herkimer County, New York. It drains northwest via an unnamed creek that flows into Spectacle Lake.

See also
 List of lakes in New York

References 

Lakes of New York (state)
Lakes of Herkimer County, New York